Jean Surhon, also known as Jean de Surhon , Jean Surhonio , Jean Surchon , Johann Surhonio or Ioannes Suthon , (born first half of the 16th century in Mons; died after 1594) was a Franco-Flemish engraver and cartographer. 

Two other engravers and cartographers who shared the same name came from his family: Jacques Surhon (d. 1557), his father, and Jacques Surhon (d. 1610), probably his brother. Both worked in Mons. The father was also a silversmith.

From his cartographic work, three maps of areas in what is today north-eastern France and southern Belgium have survived: Namur (1553), Vermandois (1557) and Picardy (1557). The first edition of the atlas Theatrum Orbis Terrarum by Abraham Ortelius — published in Antwerp in 1570 — contained the map of Vermandois. In another edition from 1579, the maps of Namur and Picardy by Ortelius were published.

In some editions - such as a print published by Pieter van den Keere in Amsterdam in 1622 - Jean Surhon is incorrectly named as the author of a map of the Artois region, actually created by father Jacques Surhon in 1554.
The maps of Vermandois and Picardy were later used in the atlas Le Theater Francoys , published in Tours by Maurice Bouguereau in 1594

References

External links 
 
 Entry in Deutsche Biographie

16th-century cartographers
16th-century engravers
16th-century births
Date of birth unknown
Date of death unknown
People from Mons